Anti-appeasement steles were 19th century monuments built in Korea to ostracize Westerners. They were erected by Heungseon Daewongun at more than 200 major transportation hubs across the country, including the four streets of Jongno. They were built in 1871 (the 8th year of the reign of Emperor Gojong of the Joseon dynasty). They were made of granite and were four cubits high, five cubits wide, and eight inches thick.

History  

When Emperor Gojong ascended the throne in 1863 at a young age, Lee Ha-eung, King Gojong's father was appointed as Daewongun took power. At this time countries such as the United States and Russia were approaching the Korean Peninsula. They came to Joseon to demand commerce and sometimes staged armed provocations and demonstrations.

Daewongun tried to negotiate with France to keep Russia in check during his early years in office, but he quickly changed his policy stance to Sakoku after the outbreak of Byeonginyo in 1866 and an attempt to rob the king's tomb. In particular, Daewongun established a policy of Sakoku that prohibited diplomatic relations and commerce with foreign countries to maintain order of the Joseon dynasty in 1871. In order to warn the people, in April 1871 in the central regions of Seoul and across the country stelae were set up by fire hydrants.

In 1882 Japan invaded Korea and Daewongun was kidnapped by the Qing dynasty. Most of the stelae were demolished at the request of the Japanese government. In Seoul one was buried near Bosingak Pavilion in Jongno on September 26, 1882. It was discovered in June 1915 when Bosingak was relocated and displayed in a gallery west of Geunjeongjeon Hall in Gyeongbokgung Palace.

Stelae remain in about 30 locations.

Content

The following words are written on the stele as an order:

洋夷侵犯 非戰則和 主和賣國

Then, in small letters, the next phrase is written on the side of the rain.

戒我萬年子孫 丙寅作 辛未立

This means, "If you don't fight for Western's invasion, you'll surrender, so if you insist on surrender, you'll sell your country. I warn all the people.. Build it in Byeongin-year and set it up in Sinmi-year."

List of stele

References

See also 
 :ko:경고비
 Sakoku

Joseon dynasty
History of Korea